Henrik Per-Erik Rydström (born 16 February 1976) is a Swedish football manager and former player who manages Allsvenskan club Malmö FF.

As of 2013 he was the sixth longest serving player in the world when it comes to playing for the same club.

Career
He made his debut for Kalmar FF in 1994 and played his last game for the team in 2013. A defensive midfielder known for a good passing foot and superb leadership on and off the pitch. In the spring of 2008 he was named best club captain of Allsvenskan in a vote from the players of the league.
Henrik Rydström holds the club record for most games played for Kalmar FF with 802 games.

Honours and awards

Player 
Kalmar FF
Allsvenskan: 2008
Svenska Cupen: 2007
Svenska Supercupen: 2009

References

External links
 
 Kalmar FF Profile

1976 births
Living people
Swedish footballers
Kalmar FF players
Association football midfielders
People from Karlskrona
Sportspeople from Blekinge County